Vernon Thomas (born 1935) is a Kolkata-based Anglo Indian author. He is the author of 119 books, novels and retold stories for children, teenagers and young adults. While most of his books have been brought out by Pauline Publications, as many as 250 short stories of his have been published in journals in India, Italy, the UK and South Africa. Thomas lost his eyesight in 1994 as a result of two faulty cataract operations and continues to write.

Honors and awards
The Kolkata Archdiocese conferred the Life Time Achievement Award on Vernon Thomas, emulating a similar award bestowed on the veteran writer by the SARNEWS agency. The award consists of a citation and an exquisitely made wooden book, which opens up to an acrylic page where the dedication is engraved. 

Thomas has been featured in Men Of Achievement and The International Who’s Who of World Authors published by the Biographical Centre of Cambridge, England. A Commerce graduate, Thomas did a postal course in the art of storytelling from the Regent Institute of London. He has a fan club based in Howrah, managed by Argha Mukherjee.

Bibliography

Original Fiction
The Mystery of the Secret Package
The Mystery of the Strange Look Alike
Mystery at St. Anne's Home
Mystery at St. Lucy's
Mystery of the Strange Legacy
Mystery of the Elusive Thief
Secret of the Haunted House
The Mummy’s Little Man
Bobby Blues
Aunt Agatha’s Cataract Days
Just Grandma and Other Humorous Stories
Roses for Remembrance
Tomorrow May Be Too Late and Other Stories
The Mystery at Lime Tree House

Retold Stories
Famous Old Fairy Tales
Legends from Northern India
Fairy Tales from India
Folk Tales from India
Bedtime Stories from India
More stories from the Arabian nights

References

External links
https://web.archive.org/web/20071008204454/http://www.stpaulsbyb.com/classicsretold.html 
Pauline Novels Short Stories
Vernon Thomas RIP

Writers from Kolkata
Living people
1935 births